The Tree Register, or more fully, the Tree Register of the British Isles (T.R.O.B.I.), is a registered charity collating and updating a database of notable trees throughout Britain and Ireland. It comprises a computer database which in 2022 contained details of 250,000 trees.

It contains data from the original hand-written records of the late and internationally acclaimed dendrologist Alan Mitchell, and other historical records taken from reference works going back more than 200 years. Recent height and girth measurements can be compared to those recorded by the likes of Loudon (1830s), Elwes and Henry (early 1900s) and the Hon. Maynard Greville (1950s), providing a valuable record of growth rates. The Tree Register was one of the founders of the Ancient Tree Hunt campaign.

See also
The Tree Council
Champion Trees

References

External links

Environmental charities based in the United Kingdom
Ecology of the British Isles
Organisations based in Bedford
Trees of the United Kingdom